Danny Jonasson (born 1 October 1974) is a Danish former road cyclist. Professional from 1997 to 2002, he notably competed in the 2002 Giro d'Italia and the 1997 Vuelta a España.

Major results
1998
 1st Stage 3a Regio-Tour
 1st Stage 5 GP Tell
1999
 3rd GP Herning
 4th Overall Tour de Langkawi
 5th GP Aarhus
2000
 2nd Rund um die Hainleite-Erfurt
 4th Overall Tour de Normandie
 5th Grand Prix Midtbank
 6th Cholet-Pays de Loire
 6th GP Aarhus
 9th Sparkassen Giro Bochum
2001
 1st Stage 5 Rheinland-Pfalz Rundfahrt

References

External links

1974 births
Living people
Danish male cyclists
People from Hørsholm Municipality
Sportspeople from the Capital Region of Denmark